United Socialists – PSI was a minor social-democratic political party in Italy. Its leaders were Bobo Craxi and Saverio Zavettieri.

History
The party, which was launched at a convention in Rome on 10 October 2009, would emerge from the merger of The Italian Socialists, the faction of the Socialist Party (PS) around Craxi (who was the founder of The Italian Socialists in 2005) and possibly some other figures from the late Italian Socialist Party. Craxi had earlier left the PS because he did not agree with its merger into Left Ecology Freedom (SEL). However, in November, the PS refused to merge into SEL too. Subsequently Craxi renewed his party membership. 

In 2011 the party merged into the Italian Reformists.

References

External links
Official website

2009 establishments in Italy
2012 disestablishments in Italy
Defunct political parties in Italy
Defunct social democratic parties in Italy
Political parties disestablished in 2012
Political parties established in 2009